The Man Inside is a 1990 American drama film directed by Bobby Roth. It stars Jürgen Prochnow and Peter Coyote. It was nominated for a Mystfest award in 1990.

Cast
Jürgen Prochnow as Günter Wallraff
Peter Coyote as Henry Tobel
Nathalie Baye as Christine
Dieter Laser as Leonard Schroeter
Monique van de Ven as Tina Wallraff
 Philip Anglim as Rolf Gruel 
 Henry G. Sanders as Evans
 James Laurenson as Mueller 
 Sylvie Granotier  as Kathy Heller 
 Hippolyte Girardot as Rudolph Schick 
 Joe Sheridan  as Karl
Philippe Leroy as Borges (credited as Philippe Leroy Beaulieu)
Christine Murillo as Angela
Barbara Williams as Judie Brandt
Florence Pernel as Angel
Gert Haucke as Heinz Herbert Schultz
Günter Meisner as Judge

Soundtrack

L'Affaire Wallraff (The Man Inside) is the seventeenth soundtrack album by Tangerine Dream and their forty-third overall.

References

External links

1990 films
1990 drama films
American drama films
French drama films
Films directed by Bobby Roth
Films set in West Germany
Films shot in Cologne
Films about tabloid journalism
Films about mass media owners
Films scored by Tangerine Dream
1990s English-language films
1990s American films
1990s French films